Saharan may refer to:
 Someone or something from the Sahara desert
 Sahrawi people (also spelled Saharawi), the indigenous people of Western Sahara
 Saharan languages, a subgroup of the Nilo-Saharan languages

Language and nationality disambiguation pages